The year 1927 was marked, in science fiction, by the following events.

Births and deaths

Births 
 June: Lynn Venable
 July 19 : Richard E. Geis, American writer (died 2013)
 July 25 :  Pierre-Jean Brouillaud, French writer
 August 9 : Daniel Keyes, American writer (died 2014)
 October 3 : Donald R. Bensen, American writer and editor (died 1997)

Deaths

Events

Awards 
The main science-fiction Awards known at the present time did not exist at this time.

Literary releases

Novels 
  Radiopolis, by Otfrid von Hanstein.
  Dix mille lieues dans les airs, by Otfrid von Hanstein.
  The Garin Death Ray by Alexey N. Tolstoy.

Stories collections

Short stories 
 Night on the Galactic Railroad, by Kenji Miyazawa.
 The Colour Out of Space, by Howard Phillips Lovecraft.

Comics

Audiovisual outputs

Movies 
 Metropolis, by Fritz Lang.

See also 
 1927 in science
 1926 in science fiction
 1928 in science fiction

References

Science fiction by year

science-fiction